Stephanie Dickins (born 9 January 1995) is a field hockey player from New Zealand, who plays as a defender.

Personal life
Dickins was born and raised in Āpiti, New Zealand.

Career

National teams

Under-21
Throughout her junior career, Dickins was a member of the New Zealand U-21 team on three occasions. She represented the team during a test series in Breda; at the 2016 Junior Oceania Cup on the Gold Coast; and at the 2016 FIH Junior World Cup in Santiago.

Black Sticks
Dickins made her debut for the Black Sticks in 2017 during a test series against Argentina in Buenos Aires.

During 2019, Dickins represented the New Zealand team during the inaugural tournament of the FIH Pro League. Following the Pro League, Dickins appeared at the Oceania Cup in Rockhampton, where the Black Sticks won gold and gained qualification to the 2020 Summer Olympics.

Dickins was named in the Black Sticks squad for the 2020 calendar year.

International goals

References

External links
 
 
 
 
 

1995 births
Living people
Female field hockey defenders
People from Manawatū-Whanganui
Field hockey players at the 2020 Summer Olympics
Olympic field hockey players of New Zealand
Field hockey players at the 2022 Commonwealth Games
21st-century New Zealand women
20th-century New Zealand women